Craig William Hoy is a Scottish Conservative Party politician. He is Chairman of the Scottish Conservative and Unionist Party.

Hoy also serves as the Scottish Conservatives' Shadow Minister for social care and is a member of the shadow health team and a member of the shadow cabinet.

He has been a Member of the Scottish Parliament (MSP) for the South Scotland region since the 2021 election.

He also stood in East Lothian. He was a member of East Lothian Council, representing the Haddington and Lammermuir ward, having been elected in a by-election in 2019. 

He is a member of the Scottish Parliament's Public Audit Committee. He is also a member of the UK Board of the Conservative Party.

Hoy contested the East Lothian seat in the 2019 United Kingdom general election, where he finished third. He is a former journalist, having worked for the BBC, Parliamentary Communications and was a cofounder of Holyrood magazine. He served as a UK Managing Director of Dods, the political intelligence, media, events and training company.

In 2008 he co-founded PublicAffairsAsia, a publishing and events company in Hong Kong, and worked in the capacity of Executive Director for nearly a decade.

Since his election to Holyrood, he has taken an active interest in health and social care policy and has promoted the next generation of nuclear energy in Scotland.

Hoy is the Convenor of the Cross-Party Group on Beer and Pubs, Vice Convenor of the Cross-Party Group on St Andrew’s Day and a Member of the Cross-Party Group on Mental Health.

He appears regularly on broadcast media and writes a fortnightly column for The East Lothian Courier.

Hoy lives with his partner, with whom he is in a civil partnership, in East Lothian.

References

External links 
 

Year of birth missing (living people)
Living people
Conservative MSPs
Members of the Scottish Parliament 2021–2026
British political journalists
People from East Lothian